This is a list of female tennis players who meet one or more of the following criteria:

 Singles:
Officially ranked among the top 25 by the Women's Tennis Association (since 1975)
Ranked among the top 10 by an expert (e.g. A. Wallis Myers) before 1975
Reached the quarterfinals of a Grand Slam tournament
Reached the finals of or won the year-end championships
Won a medal at the Olympic Games
Doubles:
Won a Grand Slam tournament or year-end championship
Officially ranked No. 1 by the WTA (since 1984)
Won a medal at the Olympic Games

List

See also

List of male tennis players
List of sportspeople
List of WTA number 1 ranked singles tennis players
List of WTA number 1 ranked doubles tennis players
Top ten ranked female tennis players
Top ten ranked female tennis players (1921–1974)
List of Grand Slam women's singles champions

References